The 1872 United States presidential election in Ohio was held on November 5, 1872 as part of the 1872 United States presidential election. State voters chose 22 electors to the Electoral College, who voted for president and vice president.

Ohio was won by the Republican Party candidate, incumbent President and Ohio native Ulysses S. Grant, who won the state with 53.24% of the popular vote. The Democratic and Liberal Republican Party candidate, Horace Greeley, garnered 46.15% of the popular vote.

Results

Results by county

See also
 United States presidential elections in Ohio

References

Ohio
1872
1872 Ohio elections